Ran Sagiv (born 25 March 1997) is an Israeli triathlete. He competed in the men's event at the 2020 Summer Olympics.

References

External links
 
 

1997 births
Living people
Israeli male triathletes
Olympic triathletes of Israel
Triathletes at the 2020 Summer Olympics
Place of birth missing (living people)